Wanted is a 1967 Italian Western film directed by Giorgio Ferroni  and starring Giuliano Gemma, Teresa Gimpera, and Nello Pazzafini. Gemma made two more westerns directed by Ferroni, with similar plots, where his character likewise carried the first name "Gary".

Plot
Gary Ryan, a local sheriff (Giuliano Gemma) is unjustly accused of murder in a small town and forced to flee. He gets rid of his enemies one by one while he tries to prove his innocence.

Cast
Giuliano Gemma as  Gary Ryan
Germán Cobos as  Martin Heywood 
Teresa Gimpera as  Evelyn
Serge Marquand as  Fred Lloyd
Daniele Vargas as  Mayor Samuel "Gold" Goldensberg 
Gia Sandri as  Cheryl
Nello Pazzafini as Father Carmelo
Benito Stefanelli as  Bob Baker
Carlo Hintermann as Judge Anderson 
Tullio Altamura as Ellis
Riccardo Pizzuti as Mathias
Franco Balducci as  Cuzack

Release
Wanted was first released in 1967.

Reception
From contemporary reviews, an anonymous reviewer in the Monthly Film Bulletin noted that "the violence in this Western is excessive even by Italian imitation standards. Still, the plot is a for a change refreshingly straight-forward [...] and the location photography is particularly attractive."

References

Sources

External links

Wanted at Variety Distribution

1967 films
1967 Western (genre) films
Films directed by Giorgio Ferroni
Spaghetti Western films
Films scored by Gianni Ferrio
1960s Italian films